Blato is a village on the island of Mljet in southern Croatia.

References

Populated places in Dubrovnik-Neretva County
Mljet